Abdulaziz Majrashi (born 21 July 1991) is a Saudi Arabian professional footballer who plays as a right-back for Saudi Pro League side Al-Tai.

Club career
Majrashi began his career at Al-Wehda where he spent five seasons at the club. He earned promotion to the Pro League with the club during the 2011–12 season and the 2014–15 season. On 21 September 2015, Majrashi Al-Fayha on loan. On 5 July 2016, Majrashi joined Al-Raed on a free transfer. On 25 September 2016, Majrashi joined Al-Fayha on a permanent deal. He won the 2016–17 Saudi First Division and earned promotion to the Pro League with Al-Fayha. On 12 September 2017, Majrashi joined Al-Fateh on loan. On 23 August 2018, Majrashi joined Al-Kawkab on loan. On 28 August 2019, Majrashi was released from his contract by Al-Fayha. On the same day Majrashi joined Al-Adalah. On 28 June 2021, Majrashi joined newly promoted side Al-Tai on a two-year deal.

Honours
Al-Wehda
 First Division runner-up: 2014–15, 2014–15

Al-Fayha
 First Division: 2016–17

References

External links
 

1991 births
Living people
Sportspeople from Mecca
Saudi Arabian footballers
Association football fullbacks
Saudi Professional League players
Saudi First Division League players
Al-Wehda Club (Mecca) players
Al-Fayha FC players
Al-Raed FC players
Al-Fateh SC players
Al-Kawkab FC players
Al-Adalah FC players
Al-Tai FC players